Alligator River may refer to:
 Alligator Rivers, three rivers, the East, West, and South Alligator Rivers, at the Top End region of Australia
 Alligator River (North Carolina), US
 Alligator River National Wildlife Refuge in North Carolina, US

See also
 Alligator Creek (disambiguation)
 The Great Alligator River, a 1979 Italian film